Charaxes thysi is a butterfly in the family Nymphalidae. It is found in Cameroon, Gabon, the Republic of the Congo and the Democratic Republic of the Congo.

Description

Ch. thysi Capronn. male above black with intensive blue reflection; both wings beyond the middle with a common dark blue transverse band, on the hindwing 6 mm. in breadth, on the forewing somewhat narrower and broken up into spots; hindwing with white submarginal dots and bluish marginal streaks. This remarkably beautiful but very rare species differs from all other African forms in its bright silvery under surface, which is divided beyond the middle by a red-brown, black-spotted transverse band 2—-3 mm. in breadth. The female is unknown. Congo.

Biology
The habitat consists of forests.

Taxonomy
Charaxes thysi is a member of the large species group Charaxes etheocles.

Realm
Afrotropical realm

References

Victor Gurney Logan Van Someren, 1972 Revisional notes on African Charaxes (Lepidoptera: Nymphalidae). Part VIII. Bulletin of the British Museum (Natural History) (Entomology)215-264.

External links
Images of C. thysi Royal Museum for Central Africa (Albertine Rift Project)
Charaxes thysi images at Consortium for the Barcode of Life including Holotype
External images

Butterflies described in 1889
thysi
Butterflies of Africa